Eric (Old Norse: Eiríkr, Swedish: Erik) was a Swedish monarch or local ruler who ruled at Uppsala, an important early Swedish political center, around or before the year 800. His existence is attested by the Sparlösa Runestone, erected around the year 800, which mentions a "Eyvísl, Eiríkr's son" and that "the father sat in Uppsala" (i. e. Eyvísl's father, Eiríkr, was king in Uppsala).

As Eric and other "proto-historic" Swedish kings (preceding Eric the Victorious  970) are poorly attested and were likely only local rulers (the power of the Uppsala kings probably only extended to the immediate regions around Lake Mälaren), they are generally not counted as "Kings of Sweden" in modern scholarship. They are generally assumed to have been of the same dynasty as Eric the Victorious, the House of Munsö.

Attempts at consolidating those Swedish rulers attested by more contemporary sources with the elaborate lines of legendary kings presented in 12th and 13th century Icelandic sagas have been made, but the sources do not agree with each other and any attempt at identifying Eric with a king from the sagas has to be seen as unverifiable and unreliable. Another theory is that this Eric is the same king as the King Eric mentioned in the Vita Ansgarii.

See also 

 List of Swedish monarchs
 List of legendary kings of Sweden

References

Cited web sources 

 
 
 

House of Munsö
9th-century Swedish people
9th-century rulers in Europe